The shells of large saltwater bittersweet clams in the genus Glycymeris have a special archaeological significance in the southwestern USA, because the shells were used in trade item production by the Hohokam tribe of Amerindians. In this context the shells are known to archeologists as "Glycymeris shells".

These Glycymeris shells came from a very large (up to 10 cm) and handsome species, Glycymeris gigantea, which is found in what is now western Mexico, from the Pacific coast of Baja California, throughout the Gulf of California, and from there as far south as Acapulco. 

The Hohokam people primarily used these large shells to make bracelets and rings; the center of the shell was generally removed immediately after the bivalves were collected, and before transport back to the Hohokam villages in the Gila Basin.

There are several scholarly journals which have articles dealing with shell trade in the American Southwest which mention the Glycymeris shell.

Finds of Glycymeris have also been made in Europe with finds in Vinča. Glycymeris shells have also been found in the eyes of statuettes found in Ur.

References
 Colton, Harold Sellers. Prehistoric Trade in the Southwest. The Scientific Monthly. Vol 52, No.4 (Apr., 1941): 308-319.
 Woodward, Arthur. A Shell Bracelet Manufactory. American Antiquity. Vol. 2, No. 2 (Oct., 1936): 117-125.
 Keen, Myra, 1971. Sea shells of tropical west America, second edition, Stanford University Press.

Glycymeris
Hohokam
Marine fauna of the Gulf of California
Western North American coastal fauna